WEGT may refer to:

 WEGT (FM), a radio station (89.9 FM) licensed to serve Greensburg, Indiana, United States
 WXTY, a radio station (99.9 FM) licensed to serve Lafayette, Florida, United States, which held the call sign WEGT from 2002 to 2010